Sarah Moundir (born 29 May 1992 in Lucerne) is a Swiss tennis player.

Moundir won one doubles title on the ITF tour in her career, and, in February 2010, made three appearances for the Switzerland Fed Cup team.

ITF finals (1–1)

Doubles (1–1)

Fed Cup participation

Singles

Doubles

References

External links 
 
 
 

1992 births
Living people
Sportspeople from Lucerne
Swiss female tennis players
University of Geneva alumni